Hydroxyprogesterone heptanoate benzilic acid hydrazone (OHPHBH), also known as 17α-hydroxyprogesterone 17α-heptanoate 3-benzilic acid hydrazone, is a progestin medication which was never marketed. It is the C3 benzilic acid hydrazone of hydroxyprogesterone heptanoate (OHPH). The medication has a longer duration of action than OHPH when administered by subcutaneous injection in animals.

See also
 Testosterone enantate benzilic acid hydrazone
 List of progestogen esters § Esters of 17α-hydroxyprogesterone derivatives

References

Abandoned drugs
Benzilic acid hydrazone esters
Enanthate esters
Esters
Hydrazones
Pregnanes
Progestogen esters
Progestogens